The Draper–Steadman House (also known as the Draper–Steadman–Morgan House) is a historic house located at 13518 South 1700 West in Riverton, Utah.

Description and history 
Constructed in 1894, its NRHP nomination asserted that, "the house is architecturally significant as one
of the best examples of the Victorian Eclectic style in Riverton and as a rare
example of the double cross-wing house type." Also on the property is one contributing building, originally used as a privy and built from the same bricks as the main house. There are other non-contributing structures on the property, some of which were apparently destroyed by fire sometime in the late 1970s.

The people for whom the house is named are Josiah Draper, the original owner of the house, James Steadman, a subsequent owner who constructed two additions to the house, and Vernon H. Morgan, who purchased the house from James Steadman.

It was listed on the National Register of Historic Places on August 21, 1992.

References

Houses on the National Register of Historic Places in Utah
Victorian architecture in Utah
Neoclassical architecture in Utah
Houses completed in 1894
Houses in Salt Lake County, Utah
National Register of Historic Places in Salt Lake County, Utah
Riverton, Utah